Geertruida Leonie Hennipman-Cruiming (better known as Truus Hennipman; born 15 June 1943) is a retired sprinter from the Netherlands. She was part of the Dutch 4×100 m relay team that finished in fourth place at the 1968 Summer Olympics, equaling the world record in the heats. Individually, she failed to reach the finals in the 100 m and 200 m events. Her personal bests are 11.59 seconds in the 100 m and 23.43 seconds in the 200 m, both achieved in 1968.

References

1943 births
Living people
Athletes (track and field) at the 1968 Summer Olympics
Dutch female sprinters
Olympic athletes of the Netherlands
Athletes from Amsterdam
Olympic female sprinters
20th-century Dutch women
21st-century Dutch women